The list of ship launches in 1719 includes a chronological list of all ships launched in 1719.


References 

1719
Ship launches